The Curtiss P-6 Hawk is an American single-engine biplane fighter introduced into service in the late 1920s with the United States Army Air Corps and operated until the late 1930s prior to the outbreak of World War II.

Design and development
The Curtiss Aeroplane and Motor Company (which became the Curtis-Wright Corporation (15 July 1929) supplied the USAAC with P-6s beginning in 1929.

Operational history

A fast and highly maneuverable aircraft for its time, the XP-6 prototype took 2nd place in the 1927 U.S. National Air Races, and the XP-6A with wing surface radiators took first place, at 201 mph (323 km/h). The P-6 was flown in a variety of paint schemes depending on the squadron, the most famous being the "Snow Owl" markings of the 17th Pursuit Squadron based at Selfridge Field near Detroit, Michigan.

The P-6Es served between 1932 and 1937 with the 1st Pursuit Group (17th and 94th PS) at Selfridge, and with the 8th Pursuit Group (33rd PS) at Langley Field, Virginia. Numerous accidents claimed at least 27 of the 46 aircraft delivered. As the P-6Es became obsolete, instead of receiving depot overhauls, they were allowed to wear out in service and were scrapped or sold. At least one survived into 1942 in United States Army Air Forces service.

In 1932, Capt. Ruben C. Moffat flew a P-6 converted with a supercharged Conqueror engine on a record-breaking flight. He flew from Dayton, Ohio to Washington, D.C. at a speed of approximately 266 mph, at an altitude of 25,000 ft.

Variants

XP-6 Model 34P, modified from a P-1 with a Curtiss V-1570-17 Conqueror engine
XP-6A Model 34K, same as XP-6 but with untapered wings and wing radiators to reduce drag
P-6A 18 ordered by the U.S. Army, nine were fitted with Prestone- rather than water-cooled V-1570 engines
XP-6B P-1 converted to take the V-1670 engine
P-6C cancelled
XP-6D XP-6B converted to take a turbocharged V-1570-C
P-6D P-6As, (six of the seven surviving), re-engined in 1932 with turbocharged V-1570-C installed in 1932
XP-6E Model 35, also designated Y1P-22, ordered in July 1931 as P-6E prototype 
P-6E 46 delivered in 1931–1932, equipped the 17th and 33rd Pursuit Squadrons
XP-6F Modified XP-6E with a supercharger and an enclosed cockpit
XP-6G P-6E with a V-1570F

XP-6H P-6E with 4 × .30 in (7.62 mm) machine guns mounted in the wings
P-6S Hawk I, three sold to Cuba with the 450 hp (336 kW) Pratt & Whitney R-1340 Wasp radial, and one sold to Japan as the Japan Hawk with the V-1570 inverted Vee piston engine
P-11 Three ordered with the Curtiss H-1640 Chieftain engine of 600 hp (447 kW), two were completed with the V-1570 and redesignated P-6D
XP-17 P-1 used as a testbed for the experimental Wright V-1470 air-cooled inverted vee
YP-20 P-11 converted with a Wright Cyclone radial

XP-21 Two conversions of the XP-3A used to test the 300 hp (224 kW) Pratt & Whitney R-985 Wasp Junior radial, one became the XP-21A when modified with the R-975, and the other was converted to the P-1F standard 
XP-22 Temporary designation for a P-6A used to test new radiator installations for the V-1570-23 and converted back to a P-6A
XP-23 Model 63, unfinished P-6E with light alloy monocoque fuselage, improved tail, and a turbocharged G1V-1570C with a geared propeller and the turbocharger removed. Later redesignated YP-23

Operators

Republic of China Air Force operated 50 Hawk II.

Cuban Air Force received three P-6S fighters with the 450 hp (336 kW) Wasp radial engine.

Japan bought one P-6S, possibly updated with a Conqueror engine.

Royal Netherlands East Indies Army Air Force received eight examples of a P-6D with the Conqueror engine in 1930, another six were license-built by Aviolanda in 1931 and sent to Dutch East Indies as well. Three P-6 were lost before war: two in midair collision on 27 February 1936 and one probably after crash-landing 5 February 1935.

United States Army Air Corps

 Bolivian Air Force used the P-6S during the Chaco War. On 22 December 1932 a P-6 Hawk from Fortín Vitriones attacked Paraguayan gunboat ARP Tacuary which was anchored at Bahía Negra near

Surviving aircraft

A single P-6E survives. The aircraft was donated to the Smithsonian National Air and Space Museum by Mr. Edward S. Perkins of Anniston, Alabama and restored by the School of Aeronautics at Purdue University. It is on indefinite loan and display at the National Museum of the United States Air Force at Wright-Patterson AFB near Dayton, Ohio. Originally s/n 32-261 and assigned to the 33rd Pursuit Squadron, it was dropped from records at Tampa Field, Florida, in September 1939. It was restored and marked as 32-240 of 17th Pursuit Squadron, missing on a flight over Lake Erie on 24 September 1932.

Specifications (P-6E)

See also

References

Notes

Bibliography
 Bowers, Peter M. "The Great Fighter Fly-Offs: Curtiss vs. Boeing". Wings, Volume 31, Number 1, February 2001. 
 Eden, Paul and Soph Moeng, eds. The Complete Encyclopedia of World Aircraft. London: Amber Books Ltd., 2002, .

External links

 Air Force Link
 Aviation Enthusiast Corner
 March Field Air Museum
 https://web.archive.org/web/20160304035010/http://www.outerzone.co.uk/plan_files_05/5695/Curtiss_Hawk_16in_Comet_1935.pdf
 Curtiss P-6E model plan

P-06
Single-engined tractor aircraft
Curtiss P-06
Biplanes
Aircraft first flown in 1927